Trials of the Blood Dragon is a platform game developed by Ubisoft RedLynx and published by Ubisoft. As a crossover game of Far Cry 3: Blood Dragon and the Trials series, the game was released for Microsoft Windows, PlayStation 4 and Xbox One in June 2016.

Gameplay
The player controls Blood Dragons protagonist Rex Power Colt's kids Roxanne and Slayter as they ride on a physics-based motorcycle from the start of the level to the end while navigating a number of obstacles. The game introduces a grappling hook and gameplay segments in which players need to disembark from their bike and use guns to shoot enemies or utilise stealth to avoid hostile attention. The game features 27 levels.

Development
Ubisoft announced and released Trials of the Blood Dragon during their E3 2016 press conference. Players who complete the challenges in the trial version can unlock the full game for free.

Reception

Trials of the Blood Dragon received "mixed" reviews on all platforms according to the review aggregation website Metacritic.

References

External links
 
 

2016 video games
Alternate history video games
Crossover video games
Far Cry spin-off games
Motorcycle video games
Platform games
PlayStation 4 games
Racing video games
RedLynx games
Trials (series)
Ubisoft games
Video games developed in Finland
Video games with 2.5D graphics
Windows games
Xbox One games